"Kansas Song (We’re From Kansas)" is a fight song of the University of Kansas.

History
The song was written by Carson J. Robison and Jack Riley.  It was copyrighted 1922 by Abdallah Temple A.A.O.N.M.S. according to the sheet music.

The university bands usually play only one verse of the song.

References

External links
 Lyrics and MP3s

University of Kansas
American college songs
College fight songs in the United States
Big 12 Conference fight songs
1922 songs
Songs written by Carson Robison
Songs about Kansas